Shaun Kirk (born 1988 in Melbourne, Victoria, Australia) is an independent Australian soul and blues singer, songwriter, and musician. He has released four albums: Cruisin′ in 2010, Thank You For Giving Me the Blues in 2011, The Wick Sessions in 2013 and Steer the Wheel in 2014.

Career
Shaun Kirk was born in Melbourne and grew up in the city's outer eastern suburbs. He first picked up a guitar at age 16 after his mother left an old nylon string in his bedroom in the hope that it would spark some inspiration. It did and Kirk now often jokes at his shows about learning Deep Purple's 'Smoke on the Water as his first song. He then broke his ankle at age 17 and wrote his first song in the hospital bed whilst waiting for surgery. Soon after he began singing and playing in front of small crowds at blues jam nights across Melbourne, initially as a folk singer before developing a feel for the blues music. Over the years he has matured his performance and now accompanies his guitar with harmonica, stomp box, tambourine, high hat, cymbal, kick and snare drum.

In January 2010, Kirk launched his debut album, 'Cruisin''', and shortly after embarked on his first national tour of Australia playing at many of the country's regional pubs, cafes and festivals. The album then went to win the 'Best Debut Album' award at the Melbourne Blues Appreciation Society's annual VIC/TAS Blues Music Awards.

In August 2011 Shaun began working on his next album 'Thank You for Giving Me the Blues with Western Australian percussionist/producer Arunachala Satgunasingam. The album was released in December 2011 and by January 2012 had climbed to #1 on the Australian Blues/Roots Airplay Charts.

In December 2012 Kirk booked in a session at Melbourne's The Wick Studios to set about recording a live CD/DVD called The Wick Sessions that was released in March 2013.

In 2013 Kirk issued his fifth release, an EP titled Giving. The EP included the track "Give to the Needy" which featured part of Charlie Chaplin's speech from The Great Dictator.Steer the Wheel, released in 2014, was recorded at The Wick Studios in Brunswick, Victoria and was Kirk's first recording with a band which included ARIA Award winning rhythm section Danny McKenna (drums) and Grant Cummerford (bass). The album debuted at #1 on the Australian Blues iTunes Charts and included 3 singles - 'Stitches', 'Give to the Needy' and 'Two Hands on the Wheel' (feat Halfway to Forth) which all received strong airplay across Australia and internationally.

Since the birth of his career Kirk has received consistent airplay on national Australian Triple J radio and ABC Radio National, as well as on ABC Local across Australia;  consistently toured throughout Australia and abroad selling out headline shows, as well as opening for artists including Joe Bonamassa, Beth Hart, Allen Stone, JJ Grey & Mofro, Diesel, Ash Grunwald, Mia Dyson and Matt Andersen.  He's become a regular name on Australia's festival circuit appearing at some of the country's biggest such as Byron Bay Bluesfest, Woodford Folk Festival, Port Fairy Folk Festival, Queenscliff Music Festival, St Kilda Festival, Gympie Music Muster, Caloundra Music Festival and Blues on Broadbeach.

Reception
After witnessing Shaun's shows at the 2011 Woodford Folk Festival - Director of Bluesfest Byron Bay Peter Noble blogged about his performances calling him "a truly hot new artist on the blues scene".Reviewing Shaun Kirk's performance at Northcote Social Club in May 2014, critic Bradley Cowan wrote:
"Shaun Kirk proved that blues is still very much in fashion with his stellar performance... His energetic strumming and deep raspy voice hit all the right notes, causing sporadic beaming and shouts to erupt throughout the audience."

Discography
Studio albums
2010: Cruisin′2011: Thank You For Giving Me the Blues 
2014: Steer the WheelLive albums
2013: The Wick Sessions (live in the studio CD/DVD package)

EPs
2013: Giving EP2019: Shaun Kirk EPAwards and nominations
Music Victoria Awards
The Music Victoria Awards are an annual awards night celebrating Victorian music. They commenced in 2006.

! 
|-
| Music Victoria Awards of 2014
| Steer the Wheel''
| Best Blues Album
| 
| 
|-

References

Australian songwriters
Singers from Melbourne
1988 births
Living people
Australian blues guitarists
Australian harmonica players
21st-century Australian singers
21st-century guitarists
21st-century Australian male singers
Australian male guitarists